WMTA (1380 AM) is a radio station  broadcasting a hot adult contemporary format. It is licensed to Central City, Kentucky, United States. The station is currently owned by Michael and Casey Davis and Jeremy Bennefield, through licensee Custom Voice Media, GP. The station's studio and AM transmission tower are located on Oaktree Drive off U.S. Highway 62 (US 62) on the west side of Central City. The station's FM translator, W297CC, broadcasts at a frequency of 107.3 MHz from a tower located near Rose Hill Cemetery on US 62 in the eastern end of Central City.

History

The early years
The station went on the air as WMTA on February 19, 1955 as the second radio station in Central City and Muhlenberg County, Kentucky, the month after nearby WNES began broadcasting. WMTA was founded by brothers Amos and Larry Stone, who were the owners of the local weekly newspaper; The Messenger-Times Argus (founded in 1909). The station's call letters stood for the name of the newspaper. The station hosted locally-born musicians Phil and Don Everly, Dave Rich, and Merle Travis, who showcased their talents on the station’s airwaves on a regular basis during its early years.

Religious and News/Talk formats
The station remained in the hands of the original owners until 1985, when the station was sold to Thomas Broadcast Engineering of Owensboro, Kentucky which sold the station to WMTA AM 1380, Inc., in 1989. The station briefly changed its call letters to WTBL, which stood for “Where The Bible Lives” from 1988 while broadcasting a religious format for a brief amount of time. The station went silent for a brief time in the early 1990s before returning to the air as a News/Talk formatted station under their original callsign.

As a WGAB rebroadcaster
The station remained under the WMTA AM 1380, Inc. ownership and management until 2004 when it was sold to Faith Broadcasting, LLC of Evansville, Indiana, who would begin using WMTA to simulcast their Newburgh, Indiana-licensed flagship station WGAB to broadcast a Christian radio format to the area.  

On May 18, 2016, Faith Broadcasting sold WMTA to Giving Hope 2U, LLC for $160,000.

Return of local operations
On September 15, 2020, WMTA was sold again to Michael and Casey Davis. They assumed operations and flipped the station to Hot Adult Contemporary, returning that format to Muhlenberg County as "Star 107.3" on October 1. The branding was named for the athletic teams of the former Muhlenburg North High School, which were known as the Stars. The new branding also gives reference to the station's FM translator, W297CC, which was launched as part of the occasion of switching to Hot AC. On May 6, 2022, Giving Hope 2U, LLC sold the station to Custom Voice Media, GP.

Programming
In addition to its Hot AC format, the station is the local radio home of Muhlenberg County High School Mustangs football and basketball games sanctioned by the KHSAA.

References

External links
Star 107.3 website

MTA
Central City, Kentucky
Radio stations established in 1955
1955 establishments in Kentucky
Hot adult contemporary radio stations in the United States